Aaron Williams (born April 23, 1990) is a former American football safety. He was drafted by the Buffalo Bills in the second round of the 2011 NFL Draft. He played college football at Texas.

Early years 
Williams attended McNeil High School in Austin, Texas. He was considered the top safety recruit by Rivals.com and the second best cornerback recruit by Scout.com in 2008. He was selected 1st team All-State by Dave Campbell Texas Football magazine and was also named to the 2008 Parade All-American team.  Williams was named an outstanding performer at the 2007 Army National Combine which led to him being selected to the 2008 U.S. Army All-American Bowl game. He was also a two-year letterman in baseball and track & field. He chose Texas over offers from Baylor and USC.

College career 
As a freshman in 2008, Williams started one of 13 games at cornerback, recording 13 tackles and an interception which was returned 81 yards for a touchdown. As a sophomore in 2009, he played in 13 games, missing one due to an injury, and recorded 31 tackles, two sacks and three interceptions. As a junior in 2010, he started 11 games, missing two due to an injury, and recorded 45 tackles, one quarterback sack, and two forced fumbles.

Professional career

2011 NFL Draft 

Williams was selected by the Buffalo Bills as the second pick of the second round (no. 34 overall) in the 2011 NFL Draft.

Buffalo Bills 
Following an up and down first two seasons at cornerback, Williams was moved to safety for the 2013 season.

On March 5, 2014, Williams signed a four-year, $26 million extension with the Bills.

In 2015, Williams was injured in a Week 2 game against the New England Patriots while attempting a flying goal line tackle on Julian Edelman. He was completely motionless on the turf, and was taken off the field in an ambulance. Early reports stated he suffered a neck injury.

In 2016, during a Week 3 game against the Arizona Cardinals, Williams scored his first NFL touchdown, returning a botched field goal attempt for the score. In Week 7, Williams suffered another serious neck injury after a hit by Miami Dolphins wide receiver Jarvis Landry. He was placed on injured reserve on November 1, 2016, effectively ending his season.

On March 9, 2017, Williams was released by the Bills.

On January 31, 2018, Williams announced his retirement from the NFL after six seasons in Buffalo. His retirement came after multiple head and neck injuries throughout his career, citing it was the main concern of other teams not signing him after workouts in 2017, including the Jaguars, Texans, and Chiefs.

References

External links 
Buffalo Bills bio
Texas Longhorns bio
NFL combine bio
ESPN bio
Aaron Williams' Twitter

1990 births
Living people
Players of American football from San Jose, California
African-American players of American football
American football cornerbacks
American football safeties
Texas Longhorns football players
Buffalo Bills players
21st-century African-American sportspeople